"My Oh My" is a song by Cuban-American singer Camila Cabello featuring American rapper DaBaby from the former's second studio album Romance (2019). It was written by the artists, Savan Kotecha, Ant Clemons, and producers Frank Dukes & Louis Bell. Due to a strong similarity to Peruvian reggae band Tierra Sur's 1992 song "Llaman a la puerta", group leader Alejandro "Pochi" Marambio received a writing credit. The song was released on adult contemporary radio stations in the United States on January 6, 2020, as the sixth single off the album.

"My Oh My" peaked at number 12 on the US Billboard Hot 100, and also reached the top 20 in Australia, Canada, Finland, Ireland, and the United Kingdom. It received a diamond certification in Brazil, double platinum in the United States, and gold in Australia, New Zealand and the United Kingdom. A music video was released on February 12, 2020, which portrayed Cabello as an actress who overcame being cast as a damsel in distress with the assistance of an up-and-coming director portrayed by DaBaby. A remix of the song featuring American rapper Gunna was released on May 1, 2020.

Background and composition
The recording process for Cabello's second studio album Romance took under ten months, and concluded in October 2019. "My Oh My" was first teased by The Sun on November 27, 2019, where the writer Howell Davies stated that the carnal song "is her naughtiest yet" and compared it to the 2017 song "Havana".

Musically, "My Oh My" is a two-minute and fifty one second reggaeton-influenced pop song with a pop-rap and R&B-pop beat. According to the sheet music published at Musicnotes.com by Sony/ATV Music Publishing, "My Oh My" was composed using  common time in the key of C minor, with a moderate tempo of 104 beats per minute. The song follows the chord progression of Cm–A–G. Cabello's vocal range spans from the low note G3 to the high note of F5, giving the song one octave and six notes of range. The lyrics describe Cabello's intentions to date a "bad boy", which is not approved by her family.

It has been noted that parts of the song constitute musical plagiarism. In December 2019, Twitter users pointed out similarities between "My Oh My" and the 1992 song "Llaman a la puerta" by the Peruvian reggae band Tierra Sur. According to reporter Eilish O'Sullivan from The Daily Dot, "the songs' call and responses are what make them sound especially similar". Pochi Marambio, Tierra Sur's bandleader and composer of "Llaman a la puerta," announced on social media that he had hired a legal entity to contact Cabello or her representatives to reach an amicable settlement.

Commercial performance
Following the release of Romance, "My Oh My" debuted at number 82 on the US Billboard Hot 100 before peaking at number 12, becoming the second highest-charting single from the album behind "Señorita" (2019), which topped the chart in August 2019. It also debuted at number 35 on the Mainstream Top 40, where it peaked at number one on the chart dated May 9, 2020.

"My Oh My" peaked at number six in Ireland, and charted in the top 20 in various other countries including Australia, Belgium, Finland, Greece, the Netherlands, New Zealand, and Singapore. In the United Kingdom, the track reached number 13, earning Cabello her eighth top 20 single there. In Brazil, "My Oh My" received a Diamond certification on October 18, 2021 for more than 160,000 copies sold in the country.

Music video
On February 12, 2020, the music video for "My Oh My" was released at 3 pm EST on YouTube, as an old fashioned, Golden-age Hollywood, grayscale-styled video directed by Dave Meyers after it was teased by Cabello on February 5, 2020. Cabello stars as an actress who's tired of always starring as a damsel in distress and wishes to "be the hero". She then goes to a bar and meets an up-and-coming movie director, portrayed by DaBaby, who then hires her to play the role she always wanted. Throughout the video, Cabello utilizes a sword in a Kill Bill inspired film titled 'La Bonita Blade', and performs a Grease-style dance, alongside the use of subtitles.

Dance video
On May 1, 2020, a dance video was released during the COVID-19 pandemic. It featured Cabello and the dancers calling each other through FaceTime before performing the song's dance choreography in each of their homes and parks.

Lyric video
On January 10, 2020, an animated lyric video was released online. As of May 2020, it had over 18 million views on YouTube.

Accolades

Live performances
Cabello and DaBaby performed the song on The Tonight Show Starring Jimmy Fallon on December 12, 2019. Both Cabello and the backup dancers sported lime green and purple high school outfits, with the women wearing cheerleading costumes and the men wearing letterman jackets. During the performance, DaBaby also wore a Gucci sweater. Cabello performed a solo version of the song at the 2020 Global Awards on March 5, 2020. She also performed an acoustic version of the song on the iHeart Living Room Concert for America on March 29, 2020, accompanied by Shawn Mendes playing the acoustic guitar.

Track listings

Credits and personnel
Credits adapted from the liner notes of Romance.

 Publishing
 Published by Sony/ATV Songs LLC (BMI) o/b/o Sony/ATV Music Publishing (UK) LTD/Maidmetal Limited (PRS)/Milamoon Songs (BMI), EMI Blackwood Music Inc. o/b/o EMI Music Publishing LTD (PRS)/MYNY Music (BMI)/Sony/ATV Songs LLC (BMI) o/b/o Sam Fam Beats (BMI), EMI April Music Inc. (ASCAP), MXM admin. by Kobalt (ASCAP), Songs by Universal (BMI)

Recording
 Recorded by Louis Bell at Electric Feel Recording Studios, West Hollywood, California, and by Brian Taylor at Henson Recording Studios, Hollywood, California
 Mixed at Larrabee Studio, North Hollywood, California
 Mastered at the Mastering Palace, New York City, New York
 DaBaby appears courtesy of South Coast Music Group/Interscope Records

Personnel

 Camila Cabello – lead vocals, songwriting
 DaBaby – featured artist, songwriting
 Frank Dukes – production, songwriting
 Louis Bell – miscellaneous production, songwriting, recording
 Ant Clemons – songwriting
 Savan Kotecha – songwriting
 Brian Taylor – recording
 Manny Marroquin – mixing
 Chris Galland – mixing
 Kevin Peterson – mastering
 Alejandro Marambio – songwriting

Charts

Weekly charts

Year-end charts

Certifications

Release history

References

2020 singles
2019 songs
Camila Cabello songs
Songs written by Camila Cabello
Songs written by DaBaby
DaBaby songs
Songs written by Louis Bell
Songs written by Frank Dukes
Songs written by Savan Kotecha
Songs written by Ant Clemons
Music videos directed by Dave Meyers (director)
Black-and-white music videos
Albums recorded at Henson Recording Studios
Song recordings produced by Frank Dukes
Song recordings produced by Louis Bell